Reflections is the fourth studio album of Finnish metal band Apocalyptica, released in 2003 with a special-edition entitled Reflections Revised released in the later part of 2003 containing a DVD as well as the original album with five bonus tracks. The original slipcase cover is a picture of a burning cello, which is also seen in the inside traycard of all versions.  The cover is similar to the cover of the film The Red Violin.

It was the first release to have professional percussionists playing the drums. From this album on, the band needed to add a drummer to the band, later being Mikko Sirén.

"Toreador II" is a continuation of "Toreador" from Inquisition Symphony.

Track listing

DVD
 "Faraway" Live 2003
 "Enter Sandman" Live 2003
 "Inquisition Symphony" Live 2003
 "Nothing Else Matters" Live 2003
 "Somewhere Around Nothing" Live 2003
 "Somewhere Around Nothing" Video
 "Faraway, Vol. 2" Video 						
 "Seemann" Video
 "Faraway, Vol. 2" EPK
 "Reflections" EPK
 "Seemann" EPK

Personnel

Apocalyptica
Eicca Toppinen – cello, songwriting, programming 
Perttu Kivilaakso – cello, songwriting 
Paavo Lötjönen – cello

Drummers
Dave Lombardo – (1, 2, 4, 8 & 10)
Sami Kuoppamäki – (3, 5–7, 9, 11–13 & 15–19)

Additional Various Musicians
 Juhani Lagerspetz – piano (3)
Ville Väätäinen – double bass  (6, 7, 8, 10, 13) 
Pasi Pirinen – trumpet (12)
Linda Sundblad – vocals (15)

Additional Credits on "Seemann"
Nina Hagen – vocals 
Michael Wolff – vocalpainting 
Mikko Raita – mixing and recording
Teijo Jämsä – drums

Production
Mika Jussila – mastered 
T-T Oksala – mixed, programming, recording

Violins
Jaakko Kuusisto – solo (13)
Jyrki Lasonpalo 
Kerim Gribajcevic 
Lotta Nykäsenoja

Additional Cellos (10)
Antero Manninen 
Gregoire Korniluk

Album Inlay
Dirk Rudolph – album design
Mirjam Haberkorn – illustration 
Nina Parviainen – album cover model 
Aki Siik – styling 
Olaf Heine – photography

References

Apocalyptica albums
Apocalyptica video albums
2003 albums
2003 video albums
Live video albums
2003 live albums